Veinticinco de Mayo is a town in the Florida Department of southern-central Uruguay.

Geography
The railroad track Montevideo - Florida passes through the village. The stream Arroyo Isla Mala, tributary of Arroyo Santa Lucía Chico, flows along the west and north limits of the village, forming a lake or wetland to the east side of it.

History 
Its original name was "Isla Mala" and it was recognized as a recently created populated centre by a decree of 1 September 1875. It was renamed to its present name and declared a "Pueblo" (village) on 17 July 1918 by the Act of Ley N° 6.196. Its status was elevated to "Villa" (town) on 28 January 1985 by the Act of Ley N° 15.706.

Population
In 2011, Veinticinco de Mayo had a population of 1,852.
 
Source: Instituto Nacional de Estadística de Uruguay

Places of worship
 Immaculate Conception Parish Church (Roman Catholic)

References

External links
INE map of Veinticinco de Mayo

Populated places in the Florida Department